"The Way to Begin" is a Christian rock song from Christian rock/pop singer Krystal Meyers. The song served as the lead single to her self-titled debut album and peaked at No. 1 on the United States Christian CHR Charts.  It was released to radio and to digital stores such as iTunes and Rhapsody.

About "The Way to Begin"

"The Way to Begin" was composed by Krystal Meyers, Andrew Bojanic, Ian Eskelin, Elizabeth (Liz) Hooper and appears on:
Krystal Meyers, self-titled album, Release Date: June 7, 2005
Krystal Meyers [Bonus Track], Release Date: August 28, 2006
WOW Hits 2006 (track 30), Release Date: October 4, 2005
Amazing Grace: Songs of Hope and Inspiration, Release Date: August 26, 2008
Dance Praise Christian Video Game - Pop and Rock Hits Expansion Pack, Release Date: October 17, 2006

"The Way to Begin" charted at No. 1 in May 2005 on the Christian CHR Charts.

Track list
The Way to Begin (CHR Version)

References

2005 singles
Krystal Meyers songs
Songs written by Ian Eskelin
Songs written by Krystal Meyers
2005 songs
Essential Records (Christian) singles
Song recordings produced by Ian Eskelin